Darren Robert Pang (born February 17, 1964) is a Canadian former professional ice hockey goaltender. He played his professional career with the Chicago Blackhawks of the National Hockey League (1984–85 and 1987–89).

He is currently the lead color commentator with the St. Louis Blues, and is the #2 Inside the Glass analyst on TNT. He also does work for NHL Network.

Playing career
Pang grew up playing hockey in Nepean, Ontario for the Nepean Raiders. As a youth, he played alongside many future NHLers, including Doug Smith, Dan Quinn and Steve Yzerman. He and teammate Dan Quinn played in the 1977 Quebec International Pee-Wee Hockey Tournament with a minor ice hockey team from West Ottawa. Pang later played for the Nepean Raiders Major Midget team that represented Ontario in the Air Canada Cup as a 15-year-old.

He was the first goalie drafted by the expansion Belleville Bulls, winning their first ever game in the OHL. He was traded to the Ottawa 67's, where he won the Memorial Cup in 1984, while garnering the Top goalie and All-Star team awards.
 
Standing 5'5", Pang was the 2nd shortest goalie to play in the NHL, behind only Roy "Shrimp" Worters. Pang was humorously considered to have a "sixth hole" above his head. He was named to the NHL All-Rookie Team in 1988, and was a finalist for the Calder Trophy as the NHL's Rookie of the year, won by Hall of Famer Joe Nieuwendyk. His first win was recorded on October 18, 1987 against the Winnipeg Jets.

Pang was signed as a free agent by the Chicago Blackhawks on August 15, 1984. He also set a Blackhawks goaltender's record with six assists in the 1987–1988 NHL season, and had 9 points in his brief NHL career. Pang suffered a career-ending knee injury on September 21, 1990, during training camp.

Broadcast career
Today, Pang is an "Inside the Glass" reporter for both the St. Louis Blues on Bally Sports Midwest and for national games on TNT. He also works for the NHL Network. Prior to TNT, he also was an "Inside the Glass" reporter for regular season and playoff action for NBC. Pang also contributes to Home Ice, XM Satellite Radio'''s all-hockey channel. Before joining the Blues, he was the color commentator for the Phoenix Coyotes and a part time analyst for TSN. On July 9, 2009, it was announced that he would be the color commentator for the St. Louis Blues TV broadcasts, with former color man Bernie Federko, who moved between the benches, while John Kelly and Pang work together in the broadcast booth.

Previously, Pang was a top analyst for ESPN and ABC'' for 13 seasons and has broadcast over 95 Stanley Cup Finals games on national TV. He has worked as an analyst for three Winter Olympics. On CBS for the 1998 games in Nagano, Japan, he was assigned as the first Olympic reporter that received full access "between the benches" with no glass separating him from the benches. He also worked as an on ice analyst/reporter in 2002 for NBC and in 2010 he worked as a studio analyst for CTV/TSN alongside Bob McKenzie, Nick Kypreos, Daren Millard, and host James Duthie.

Career statistics

Regular season and playoffs

References

External links
 

1964 births
Arizona Coyotes announcers
Belleville Bulls players
Canadian ice hockey goaltenders
Canadian television sportscasters
Chicago Blackhawks players
Indianapolis Ice players
Living people
Milwaukee Admirals (IHL) players
National Hockey League broadcasters
Nepean Raiders players
Nova Scotia Oilers players
Ottawa 67's players
People from Grey County
Saginaw Generals players
Saginaw Hawks players
St. Louis Blues announcers
Sportspeople from Wheaton, Illinois
Undrafted National Hockey League players